A Cat, a Mouse and a Bell is a 1935 Color Rhapsodies film.

Summary
Sniffles the mouse and his friend "The Book Worm" are harassed by a cat. They figure that by belling the cat (partly true) they could hear him coming and eliminate the element of surprise. Sniffles shows great courage and succeeds.

References

1935 animated films
1930s animated short films
American animated short films
1930s American animated films
Columbia Pictures short films
1935 short films
Animated films about cats
Animated films about mice
Screen Gems short films
Columbia Pictures animated short films
Color Rhapsody